State Route 210 (SR 210), also known as the Barraza-Aviation Parkway, is a state highway located in Tucson, Arizona, United States, alongside the Union Pacific railroad. Most of it was opened around 1998.

Route description
Between its western terminus at Broadway Boulevard and Kino Parkway, SR 210 is a controlled-access expressway; farther east, it is a limited-access highway with at-grade intersections and traffic lights until its eastern terminus at Golf Links Road (at the western edge of Davis-Monthan Air Force Base).

SR 210 currently does not intersect any other state or national routes, but is planned to intersect Interstate 10 in the future.

History
The initial section of SR 210 has a very long history in Tucson. Called the Barraza-Aviation Highway, all but the last few miles were completed in the 1990s. On July 8, 2008, the Mayor and Council voted 6–0 to approve Alignment 3.d., which would extend SR 210 to I-10 at the current St. Mary's Road overpass.

According to historian David Leighton of the Arizona Daily Star newspaper, the name "Barraza" is named for union leader Maclovio R. Barraza and the word "Aviation" derives from the Aviation Field, now called Davis-Monthan Air Force Base.

Maclovio Barraza Parkway/Downtown Links Project 
After the passage of the Regional Transportation Authority plan in 2006, a portion of the sales tax increase paid for an extension plan of the parkway from Broadway Blvd. to 6th Street called Downtown Links. The new road, called the Maclovio Barraza Parkway, would go alongside the Union Pacific Railroad.  Also, the railroad crossing on 6th St., west of Stone Avenue, will be improved, providing a new underpass above the railroad. This will allow direct access from I-10 to the new parkway via 6th Street.

The Maclovio Barraza Parkway is a 4 lane, 30 Mile per Hour roadway connecting Broadway Blvd. to 6th Street. Construction of the parkway began in August of 2020 in the second phase of the RTA plan. The new Maclovio Barraza Parkway opened to all traffic on February 17, 2023. The remaining western section of the Downtown Links project is planned to be completed in Summer of 2024.

As of February 17th, 2023, it is not known if ADOT will sign Maclovio Barraza Parkway as SR 210.

Future
ADOT is undergoing a study to connect SR 210 to I-10 at Alvernon Way in southeast Tucson. The new roadway would be built to freeway standards from I-10 to the current terminus at Golf Links Road.

Exit list

References

External links

SR 210 at Arizona Roads

210
Transportation in Pima County, Arizona
Transportation in Tucson, Arizona